was a Japanese prince of the early Heian period. He was the second son of Emperor Junna.

Life 
After the death of his older half-brother , Tsunesada became Emperor Junna's successor. In 833, his cousin Emperor Ninmyō took the throne, and by the wishes of the retired emperor Saga, Tsunesada became Crown Prince. In 838, Tsunesada underwent the genbuku rite of passage in the  palace, at which he is said to have shown good manners, and cut a graceful figure as he expressed his gratitude to the Emperor. After this, Tsunesada and the retired Emperor Junna became anxious about being embroiled in a power struggle and repeatedly petitioned to resign, but Saga and Ninmyō dissuaded them each time. However, after the Jōwa Incident immediately following Saga's death in 842, Tsunesada was disinherited as crown prince.

He was administered the kanjō rite of esoteric Buddhism by Prince Takaoka, now also a monk, and became the first abbot of Daikaku-ji. When another succession dispute broke out in 884 after the abdication of Emperor Yōzei, Tsunesada was asked to take the throne, but he declined. In his last moments he is said to have announced that his time had come, purified his clothes, offered incense and flowers to the Buddha, and assumed the Lotus position and facing West before dying.

Personality 
According to the Nihon Sandai Jitsuroku, Tsunesada possessed an easy and elegant personality and a beautiful appearance.
Tsunesada was also known for his elegant calligraphy.

Genealogy 
Father: Emperor Junna
Mother: Princess Seishi, daughter of Emperor Saga
Wife: daughter of Fujiwara no Chikanari
Wife: daughter of

Notes

References 

Japanese princes
825 births
884 deaths
People of Heian-period Japan
9th-century Japanese calligraphers
Heian period Buddhist clergy
Heirs apparent who never acceded
9th-century Buddhist monks
Sons of emperors